Sidra Ameen (born 7 April 1992) is a Pakistani cricketer who currently plays for Pakistan as a right-handed batter. In June 2022,she had a total of more than 1000 runs in her ODI career,becoming the 7th Pakistani women batter with most runs. She has also played domestic cricket for Lahore, Higher Education Commission, Punjab, Omar Associates and State Bank of Pakistan.

International career
She played four matches for Pakistan at the 2013 World Cup. In October 2018, she was named in Pakistan's squad for the 2018 ICC Women's World Twenty20 tournament in the West Indies. However, prior to the tournament she was replaced by Bismah Maroof. In October 2021, she was named in Pakistan's team for the 2021 Women's Cricket World Cup Qualifier tournament in Zimbabwe.

In January 2022, she was named in Pakistan's team for the 2022 Women's Cricket World Cup in New Zealand. On 14 March 2022, in Pakistan's World Cup match against Bangladesh, Sidra scored her first century in WODI cricket, with 104 runs.

On 3 June 2022,She scored her second century of her career against Sri Lanka in the 2nd ODI.So after this century she has now more than 1000 runs in her career in ODIs.

References

External links
 
 

1992 births
Living people
Cricketers from Lahore
Pakistani women cricketers
Pakistan women One Day International cricketers
Pakistan women Twenty20 International cricketers
Lahore women cricketers
Higher Education Commission women cricketers
Punjab (Pakistan) women cricketers
Omar Associates women cricketers
State Bank of Pakistan women cricketers